William A. Jones (born June 29, 1936) is  former NBA basketball player for the Detroit Pistons. Jones was drafted with the fourth pick in the fifth round of the 1960 NBA Draft by the Pistons. In five seasons with the Pistons, Jones averaged 7.4 points per game, 2.0 assists per game and 2.8 rebounds per game.

References

1936 births
Living people
American men's basketball players
Detroit Pistons draft picks
Detroit Pistons players
Northwestern Wildcats men's basketball players
Point guards